Tenambit is a suburb of the city of Maitland, a city and local government area in the Hunter Region of New South Wales, Australia. The suburb is on sloping ground, which decreases from approximately  AMSL in the west to  AMSL at the eastern edge of the suburb. At the  it had a population of approximately 2,900.

St Egwin's Church 
St Egwin's is a church under the Anglican Diocese of Newcastle. It was erected c. 1890.

Sport

Rugby Union

Tenambit is home to the East Maitland Eagles, who play in the Newcastle and Hunter Rugby Union. Their playing strip consists of red, blue and white.

Reformed in 2007, the team reached the semi-finals in 2007, 2008 and 2009, also taking out the minor and major premierships in C grade in 2010.

The club has also produced two Bert McGregor Medalists - Craig Clark in 2007 and Adam Hewitt in 2010. (The Bert McGregor Medal is awarded to the Best & Fairest player in 2nd Division (C Grade)).

References

Suburbs of Maitland, New South Wales